Terbogrel (INN) is an experimental drug that has been studied for its potential to prevent the vasoconstricting and platelet-aggregating action of thromboxanes. Terbogrel is an orally available thromboxane A2 receptor antagonist and a thromboxane A synthase inhibitor. The drug was developed by Boehringer Ingelheim.

A phase 2 clinical trial of terbogrel was discontinued due to its induction of leg pain.

See also
 Ramatroban

References

Antiplatelet drugs
3-Pyridyl compounds
Guanidines
Nitriles
Tert-butyl compounds